Institut de Ciències de l'Espai is a Spanish institution dedicated to investigations in the field of space physics, astrophysics, and cosmology. It attracted several internationally renowned scientists, such as Sergei Odintsov.

External links
 

Research institutes in Catalonia